The Ituri Interim Assembly is a 32-member legislative body that serves as the legislature of Ituri region of the Democratic Republic of Congo. It was created in April 2003 by the Ituri Pacification Commission, a UN-sponsored commission that assessed the current state of conflict in the Ituri region. Petronille Vaweka is the chairperson of the Assembly and represents the province in the National Assembly in Kinshasa.

See also
Ituri Interim Administration

Ituri Interim Administration
Provincial legislatures of the Democratic Republic of the Congo
Ituri
2003 establishments in the Democratic Republic of the Congo